Requiem is a six-part British television drama serial, written and created by Kris Mrksa and directed by Mahalia Belo. It is a co-production between New Pictures for the BBC and Netflix. It first broadcast on BBC One on 2 February 2018, with all six episodes being released via BBC iPlayer on the same day.

The series encompasses elements of both the supernatural and thriller genres. It stars Lydia Wilson as Matilda Grey, an accomplished cellist whose life is turned upside down following her mother's suicide, which raises a number of questions about her identity and events in her past. Joel Fry stars as her best friend and fellow musician Harlan "Hal" Fine. James Frecheville, Sian Reese-Williams, Brendan Coyle, Claire Rushbrook, and Richard Harrington are also credited as principal members of the cast.

The series began filming in March 2017, with filming taking place in Wales from June 2017 and supported by funding from the Welsh Government. Location filming took place at Cefn Tilla Court in Usk, Newport, Wales and Dolgellau. It was produced by New Pictures, whose previous credits include The Missing.
It was available internationally on Netflix from 23 March 2018, and a DVD was released via Acorn Media on 19 March 2018.

Cast

Main
 Lydia Wilson as Matilda Grey; an award-winning cellist
 Joel Fry as Harlan "Hal" Fine; Matilda's best friend and fellow musician
 James Frecheville as Nick Dean; distant relative of the late Ewan Dean who inherits Dean House
 Sian Reese-Williams as Trudy Franken; Carys' childhood friend who was with her on the day she disappeared
 Brendan Coyle as Stephen Kendrick; a former Detective Inspector who investigated Carys' disappearance
 Claire Rushbrook as Rose Morgan; Carys' birth mother
 Richard Harrington as Aron Morgan; Rose's second husband
 Joanna Scanlan as Janice Gray; Maltida's mother who unexpectedly takes her own life
 Clare Calbraith as PC Graves; a local police constable who investigates the death of Ewan Dean
 Tara Fitzgerald as Sylvia Walsh; a local antiques dealer with an interest in the supernatural
 Dyfan Dwyfor as Ed Fenton; a local handyman with a mysterious connection to Aron Morgan
 Sam Hazeldine as Sean Howell; Carys' father who went missing in the years after her disappearance
 Simon Kunz as Lloyd Satlow; solicitor working on behalf of the Dean family
 Pippa Haywood as Verity Satlow; local psychiatrist

Recurring
 Charles Dale as Royce Evans; a local farmer
 Brochan Evans as David Morgan; Rose and Aron's son
 Darren Evans as PC Ian Shortly; PC Graves' partner
 Ifan Huw Dafydd as Harry Franken; landlord of the local pub
 Emmie Thompson as Carys Howell; daughter of Rose and Sean
 Oliver Lansley as Carl
 Jane Thorne as Meredith Dean; Nick's estranged aunt and initial inheritor of Dean House
 Anastasia Hille as Laura; a local woman who claims to have visions of Carys
 Bella Ramsey as young Matilda

Episodes
Airdates listed as per the BBC One broadcast. All episodes of this series were available to view on BBC iPlayer from 2 February 2018.

Production
The series was filmed primarily in Wales. St David's Hall in Cardiff stood in for a London venue, while other scenes in the fictional town of Penllynith were filmed in Newport and Dolgellau. Cefntilla Court in Monmouthshire was used as the country house where Matilda stays.

References

External links
 
 
 
 
 

2018 British television series debuts
2018 British television series endings
2010s British drama television series
2010s British mystery television series
2010s supernatural television series
BBC television dramas
British supernatural television shows
2010s British television miniseries
English-language Netflix original programming
Occult detective fiction
Suicide in television
Television series by All3Media
Television shows set in Wales